
Gmina Urzędów is a rural gmina (administrative district) in Kraśnik County, Lublin Voivodeship, in eastern Poland.

Villages
Gmina Urzędów contains the villages and settlements of Bęczyn, Boby-Kolonia, Boby-Księże, Boby-Wieś, Dębniak, Góry, Józefin, Kajetanówka, Konradów, Kozarów, Leśniczówka, Leszczyna, Majdan Bobowski, Majdan Moniacki, Metelin, Mikołajówka, Mikuszewskie, Moniaki, Moniaki-Kolonia, Natalin, Okręglica-Kolonia, Popkowice, Popkowice Księże, Rankowskie, Skorczyce, Urzędów, Wierzbica, Zadworze and Zakościelne.

Neighbouring gminas
Gmina Urzędów is bordered by the town of Kraśnik and by the gminas of Borzechów, Chodel, Dzierzkowice, Józefów nad Wisłą, Kraśnik, Opole Lubelskie and Wilkołaz.

References

Polish official population figures 2006

Urzedow
Kraśnik County